A constitutional referendum was held in Mali on 12 January 1992. The new constitution would restore multi-party democracy, create a division of powers between the President and National Assembly, and set a presidential term of five limits. It was approved by 99% of voters with a 43.5% turnout.

Results

References

1992 in Mali
1992 referendums
Referendums in Mali
Constitutional referendums